Jesse James, Jr. is a 1942 American Western film directed by George Sherman and written by Richard Murphy, Doris Schroeder and Taylor Caven. The film stars Don "Red" Barry, Lynn Merrick, Al St. John, Douglas Walton, Karl Hackett and Lee Shumway. The film was released on March 25, 1942, by Republic Pictures.

Plot

Cast 
Don "Red" Barry as Johnny Barrett
Lynn Merrick as Joan Perry
Al St. John as Pop Sawyer
Douglas Walton as Archie McDonald
Karl Hackett as Amos Martin
Lee Shumway as Banker Tom Perry
Stanley Blystone as Sam Carson
Jack Kirk as Sheriff

References

External links 
 

1942 films
1940s English-language films
American Western (genre) films
1942 Western (genre) films
Republic Pictures films
Films directed by George Sherman
American black-and-white films
1940s American films